Murder in Florida constitutes the intentional killing, under circumstances defined by law, of people within or under the jurisdiction of the U.S. state of Florida.

Generally
In Florida, a person is guilty of first-degree murder when it is perpetrated from a premeditated design to result in the death of a human being. A person is also guilty of first-degree murder if they cause the death of any individual during the commission of a predicate felony regardless of actual intent or premeditation. This is called felony murder. This offense is categorized as capital offense, so if convicted, the offender could possibly receive the death penalty.

The United States Centers for Disease Control and Prevention reported that in the year 2020, the state had a murder rate slightly above the median for the entire country.

Felony murder rule
In the state of Florida, the common law felony murder rule has been codified in Florida Statutes § 782.04.

First degree murder
The predicate felonies that will support a charge of first degree murder under the statute are: 
Drug trafficking
Arson
Sexual battery
Robbery or home invasion robbery
Burglary
Kidnapping
Escape
Aggravated abuse of a child, elderly person, or disabled adult
Aircraft piracy
Unlawful throwing, placing, or discharging of a destructive device or bomb
Carjacking
Aggravated stalking
Murder
Resisting an officer with violence to his or her person
Felonious acts of terrorism or in furtherance of an act of terrorism
Distribution of some controlled substances like cocaine and opium

Second degree murder
The statute also punishes as second degree murder the killing of another human being during the commission of a felony that is imminently dangerous to human life.  Also, if the defendant was involved in the commission of a predicate felony, but the homicide was perpetrated by another co-felon, the defendant can be charged with second degree murder.

Attempted felony murder
Florida also recognizes the offense of attempted felony murder, codified in F.S. § 782.051.  The offense punishes those that act in a way that can kill another person during the commission of one of the predicate felonies.

Penalties
Source: 

If a person committing a predicate felony directly contributed to the death of the victim then the person will be charged with murder in the first degree - felony murder which is a capital felony. The only two sentences available for that statute are life in prison and the death penalty. If the defendant was under 18, a judge sets a maximum term of 40 years and they are eligible for a review of their sentence after 25 years.

If a person commits a predicate felony, but was not the direct contributor to the death of the victim then the person will be charged with murder in the second degree - felony murder which is a felony of the first degree. The maximum prison term is life. If the defendant was under 18, a judge sets a maximum term of 30 years and they are eligible for a review of their sentence after 25 years.

See also 
 Ryan Holle, criminal defendant whose case involved a controversial application of the felony murder rule
 Jennifer Mee
 Law of Florida

References

External links
Text of the statute from the Florida Legislature

Murder in Florida
U.S. state criminal law
Florida law